The Arrival is a 1991 American science fiction horror film directed by David Schmoeller.

Plot

An alien crash lands and then enters the body of the elderly and near death Max Page (Robert Sampson). Page dies during his 73rd birthday party, but later revives on the autopsy table.

Page's health returns to him and he begins to get younger. but he soon finds that he has a thirst for the estrogen-laced blood of ovulating women. Page begins murdering the women for their blood.

Page hopes for a normal relationship with his nurse as he is now younger, but he finds that his need to murder another woman every 48 hours prevents this.

Thirteen weeks later, FBI Agent John Mills (John Saxon) arrives to track the new serial killer. He shows the photo of the suspect to Max's son, who is stunned to see his now much younger father.

Mills and Max's son deduce that the alien has taken over Page and has been killing the women.

Production
The film was shot in San Diego.

Release
The Arrival was shown at the 1991 Toronto International Film Festival as part of their Midnight Madness screenings.

Reception
From a contemporary review, Psychotronic Video magazine referred to the film as a "dull movie".

Cavett Binion (AllMovie) gave the film a two star out of five rating, noting that "very little is done with the premise of the alien's estrogen requirements, other than to show Max sniffing around in some rather inappropriate places." In his book Horror and Science Fiction Film IV, Donald C Willis described the film as "mawkish and routine except for the gradual-rejuvenation idea."

Creature Feature gave the film 3.5 out of 5 stars, stating that while the exposition on the alien is lacking, that the movie packs an emotional punch.

Moira gave the movie 2 out of four stars, praising the ideas of the movie but finding the execution somewhat lacking.

TV Guide found the movie to be lackluster, although it did find the cameos of Carolyn Purdy-Gordon as a drunk and Stuart Gordon to be of note to genre fans.

Notes

References

External links
 

American science fiction horror films
1990s science fiction horror films
Alien visitations in films
American vampire films
Films directed by David Schmoeller
Films scored by Richard Band
1990s American films
Films shot in San Diego
Films set in San Diego